Sydney, an electoral district of the Legislative Assembly in the Australian state of New South Wales, has had two incarnations, the first from 1920 to 1927 as a five-member electorate, the second from 2007 to the present as a single-member electorate.


Members for Sydney

Election results

Elections in the 2010s

2019

2015

2012 by-election

2011

Elections in the 2000s

2007

1927 - 2007

Elections in the 1920s

1925 appointment
John Birt died on 21 June 1925. Between 1920 and 1927 the Legislative Assembly was elected using a form of proportional representation with multi-member seats and a single transferable vote (modified Hare-Clark). The Parliamentary Elections (Casual Vacancies) Act, provided that casual vacancies were filled by the next unsuccessful candidate on the incumbent member's party list. Patrick Minahan had the most votes of the unsuccessful  candidates at the 1925 election and took his seat on 24 June 1925.

1925

1922

1920

Notes

References

New South Wales state electoral results by district
Politics of Sydney